Baroness Sophie de Bawr (8 October 1773 – 31 December 1860), born Alexandrine-Sophie Goury de Champgrand, was a French writer, playwright and composer, also known as "Comtesse de Saint-Simon", "Baronne de Bawr", and "M. François".

Life
She was born in Paris, the illegitimate daughter of Marquis Charles-Jean de Champgrand and opera singer Madeline-Virginie Vian. Her godmother was Madeleine-Sophie Arnould. She was raised by her father, and studied music with André Grétry, Nicolas Roze and Adrien Boieldieu and singing with Pierre Garat and Jean Elleviou.

She secretly married a young aristocrat, Jules de Rohan-Rochefort, during the Terror who was executed soon after on the scaffold. Her son from this marriage died in infancy in 1797. After surviving the French Revolution, she supported herself by writing books, music and plays. In 1801 she married Claude-Henri de Saint-Simon. After a divorce, she married the Baltic German Baron de Bawr who died in an accident, leaving her again without financial support. However, she eventually received a pension from the French government. Her Suite d'un bal masqué was highly successful and received 246 performances between 1813 and 1869. She died in Paris.

For her first three comedies, she used the pseudonym M. François.

Selected works
Alexandrine-Sophie de Bawr wrote plays, musical theater, songs, several novels, educational texts and her own memoirs. Her nonfiction texts provide important historical information. Selected works include:
La Suite d'un bal masqué, comic play, 1813
Un quart d'heure de dépit, opéra comique, 1813 (unperformed)
Les Chevaliers du lion, melodrama, 1804
Léon, ou le château de Montaldi, melodrama, 1811
La Méprise, play, 1815
Charlotte Brown, play, 1835

Literature:
Histoire de la musique, in Encyclopédie des dames, 1823
Soirées des jeunes personnes, 1852
Souvenirs, 1853

References

1773 births
1860 deaths
18th-century classical composers
18th-century French composers
18th-century French dramatists and playwrights
18th-century French women writers
18th-century French memoirists
18th-century women composers
19th-century classical composers
19th-century French composers
19th-century French dramatists and playwrights
19th-century French women writers
19th-century French memoirists
19th-century women composers
Women musical theatre composers
Women opera composers
French baronesses
French women classical composers
French musical theatre composers
French opera composers
French women dramatists and playwrights
French women memoirists
Writers from Paris
Pseudonymous women writers
18th-century pseudonymous writers
19th-century pseudonymous writers